Hussein El Sayed is an Egyptian football player currently playing for Pyramids FC

Club career
El Sayed started his career with Al-Ahly, then he played for Misr El-Makasa, before returning to Al-Ahly where he was loaned out to Saudi club Al-Ettifaq and Tunisian club CS Sfaxien. In October 2020, he decided to join Tala'ea El Gaish.

International career
El Sayed has made his debut for the Egyptian national team under Shawky Gharib on 4 June 2014 in a friendly game against Jamaica.

Statistics 
''Last update 21 July 2017

With Clubs

References

1991 births
Living people
Egyptian footballers
Egyptian expatriate footballers
Egypt international footballers
Egyptian Premier League players
Saudi Professional League players
Tunisian Ligue Professionnelle 1 players
Al Ahly SC players
Ettifaq FC players
CS Sfaxien players
Tala'ea El Gaish SC players]
Footballers from Cairo
Association football fullbacks
Expatriate footballers in Saudi Arabia
Expatriate footballers in Tunisia
Egyptian expatriate sportspeople in Saudi Arabia
Egyptian expatriate sportspeople in Tunisia